William Rawlinson may refer to:
 William Rawlinson (cricketer)
 William Rawlinson (Commissioner)